Teen pop is a subgenre of pop music that is created, marketed and oriented towards preteens and teenagers. Teen pop incorporates different subgenres of pop music, as well as elements of R&B, dance, electronic, hip hop and rock, while the music of girl groups, boy bands, and acts like Britney Spears, is sometimes referred to as pure pop. Typical characteristics of teen pop music include Auto-Tuned or pitch-corrected vocals, choreographed dances, emphasis on visual appeal (photogenic faces, unique body physiques, immaculate hair styles and fashion clothes), lyrics focused on love, relationships, dancing, partying, friendship, puppy love (also known as a "crush") and repeated chorus lines. Its lyrics also incorporate sexual innuendo. Teen pop singers often cultivate an image of a girl next door/boy next door.

According to AllMusic, teen pop "is essentially dance-pop, pop, and urban ballads" that are marketed to teens, and was conceived in its contemporary form during the late 1980s and 1990s, pointing out the late 1990s as "arguably the style's golden era." About.com's Bill Lamb described teen pop sound as "a simple, straightforward, ultra-catchy melody line [...] The songs may incorporate elements of other pop music genres, but usually they will never be mistaken for anything but mainstream pop. The music is designed for maximum focus on the performer and a direct appeal to listeners."

In Crazy About You: Reflections on the Meanings of Contemporary Teen Pop Music (2002), Phillip Vannini and Scott M. Myers write that teen pop songs "are targeted to youths presumably unaware and unconcerned with the problems of everyday society. Youths are symbolized as mainly in growing up while having a good time." Some authors deemed teen pop music as "more disposable, less intellectually challenging, more feminine, simpler and more commercially focused than other musical forms." In Music Scenes: Local, Translocal and Virtual, author Melanie Lowe wrote that teen pop "is marked by a clash of presumed innocence and overt sexuality, a conflict that mirrors the physical and emotional turmoil of its primary target audience and vital fan base: early-adolescent middle-and upper middle-class suburban girls."

History

20th century 
Teen-oriented popular music had become common by the end of the swing era, in the late 1940s, with Frank Sinatra being an early teen idol. However, it was the early 1960s that became known as the "golden age" for pop teen idols, who included Paul Anka, Frankie Avalon, Fabian, Lulu and Ricky Nelson. During the 1970s, one of the most popular preteen and teen-oriented acts was the Osmonds, where family members Donny and Marie both enjoyed individual success as well as success as a duo apart from the main family (Donny also recorded with his brothers as the Osmonds).

The first major wave of teen pop after the counter-culture of the 1960s and 1970s occurred in the mid to late 1980s, with artists such as Menudo, New Edition, the Jets, Debbie Gibson, Tiffany, Martika, New Kids on the Block and Kylie Minogue. In the early 1990s, teen pop dominated the charts until grunge and gangsta rap crossed over into the mainstream in North America by late 1991. Teen pop remained popular in the United Kingdom with the boy band Take That during this period, until the mid-1990s when Britpop became the next major wave in the UK, eclipsing the style similar to how grunge did in North America.

In 1996, British girl group Spice Girls released their debut single "Wannabe", which made them major pop stars in the UK, as well as in the US the following year. In their wake, other teen pop groups and singers rose to prominence, including Hanson, the Backstreet Boys, *NSYNC, Robyn, All Saints, S Club 7, Five, B*Witched, and Destiny's Child. In 1999, the success of teenaged pop singers Britney Spears, Christina Aguilera, Jessica Simpson, and Mandy Moore marked the development of what AllMusic refers to as the "pop Lolita" trend, sparking the short careers of upcoming pop singers such as Willa Ford, Brooke Allison, Samantha Mumba, Jamie-Lynn Sigler, Mikaila, Amanda, Nikki Cleary and Kaci Battaglia. 
In 2001, artists like Aaron Carter, Swedish group A-Teens, girl groups 3LW, Play, Eden's Crush and Dream and boy bands O-Town, B2K and Dream Street were teen pop artists who achieved success. In Latin America, successful singers and bands appealing to tweens and teens were Sandy & Junior, RBD and Rouge.
According to Gayle Ward, the demise of this late 1990s teen pop was due to:
promotional oversaturation of teen pop music in the early 2000s;
the public's changing attitude toward it, deeming teen pop as inauthentic and corporately produced;
the transition of the pre-teen and teenage fanbase of these teen pop artists during 1997–1999 to young adulthood (and the accompanying changes in musical interests);
a growing young adult male base classifying the music, especially boy band music, as effeminate, and
other musical genres began increasing in popularity.

1990s and early 2000s teen pop artists eventually entered hiatuses and semi-retirements (*NSYNC, Dream, Destiny's Child) or changed their musical style, including the Backstreet Boys, Britney Spears, Christina Aguilera, Jessica Simpson, Mandy Moore, 3LW and Aaron Carter. Many teen artists starting incorporating genres such as pop rock, contemporary R&B and hip-hop. B2K were a hip hop/pop/R&B group consisting of four teenage black boys, and were considered a boy band, though they were only active from 2000 to 2004. Their style of music was very different than other teenage artists, sounding more mature than the typical boy band, though all members were in their mid-teenage years at the time.

21st century 

In the mid to late 2000s, teenage singers such as Rihanna and Chris Brown achieved success, indicating new relevance of teen-oriented pop music.

In 2005, AKB48 was created to promote idol culture and Japanese pop nationwide and overseas followed by the expansion of sister groups and rival groups locally and internationally over the years. In 2016, SNH48, as AKB48's second international sister group, announced its local Chinese sister groups like BEJ48, GNZ48, SHY48 and CKG48 to integrate idol culture with a Chinese twist.

The emergence of Canadian singer Justin Bieber created a renewed interest in teen pop, especially of the traditional male teen idol. With the release of his debut seven-track EP My World on December 5, 2009, he became the first artist to have seven songs from a debut album chart on the Billboard Hot 100. Since his debut, Bieber has played a key role in influencing modern popular culture and has sold over 150 million records worldwide, making him one of the best-selling artists of all time.

In 2010, the creation of Ark Music Factory helped contributed a new generation of teen pop artists via the Internet, such as Rebecca Black and Jenna Rose, despite major criticism with these artists due to the excessive use of auto-tune. As for Japanese teen pop culture, the category of "idol" was playing an important role. Momoiro Clover Z is ranked as number one among female idol groups according to 2013–2017 surveys.

By the late 2010s, K-pop artists such as BTS and Blackpink, attained international stardom in teen pop culture. Having sold over 4.7 million copies, Map of the Soul: 7 by BTS is the all-time best-selling album in South Korea. BTS is the first Asian and non-English-speaking act to be named International Federation of the Phonographic Industry (IFPI) Global Recording Artist of the Year (2020). The group was featured on Time's international cover as "Next Generation Leaders" in 2018 and are recognised as the "Princes of Pop".

See also

References

External links 
 [ Teen pop] at Allmusic

 
Pop music genres
Youth culture
20th century in music
21st century in music
1980s in music
1990s in music
2000s in music
2010s in music
1990s fads and trends
2000s fads and trends